Last Ride is a 2009 Australian drama film directed by Glendyn Ivin. It is based on the novel The Last Ride by Denise Young. The film follows a young boy (Tom Russell) accompanying his father (Hugo Weaving), who is wanted by the police, across Australia.

The film was given a limited release across Australia on 2 July 2009, and in the United States on 29 June 2012.

Cast
 Hugo Weaving as Kev
 Tom Russell as Chook
 Kelton Pell as Lyle
 Anita Hegh as Maryanne

Reception
The film received universal acclaim from film critics. It holds a 93% approval rating on review aggregator Rotten Tomatoes, based on 29 reviews. Last Ride received four and a half stars from Margaret Pomeranz and David Stratton respectively on At The Movies. Roger Ebert also gave it the maximum four stars. He later went on to name it as one of the best films of 2012.

Music for end credits
'Home' by The Burning Leaves

See also
Cinema of Australia

References

External links
 

2009 films
Australian drama films
Films shot in Flinders Ranges
Films set in the Outback
Films based on Australian novels
2009 directorial debut films
2009 drama films
2000s English-language films
2000s Australian films